The 1977 Israel Super Cup was the seventh Israel Super Cup (12th, including unofficial matches, as the competition wasn't played within the Israel Football Association in its first 5 editions, until 1969), an annual Israel football match played between the winners of the previous season's Top Division and Israel State Cup. 

The match was played between Maccabi Tel Aviv, champions of the 1976–77 Liga Leumit and Maccabi Jaffa, runners-up in the league, as Maccabi Tel Aviv also won the 1976–77 Israel State Cup.

This was Maccabi Tel Aviv's 4th Israel Super Cup appearance (including unofficial matches) and Maccabi Jaffa's first. At the match, played at Bloomfield Stadium, Maccabi Tel Aviv won 3–2.

Match details

References

1977
Super Cup
Super Cup 1977
Super Cup 1977
Israel Super Cup matches